Euglandina liebmanni is a species of predatory air-breathing land snail, a terrestrial pulmonate gastropod mollusk in the family Spiraxidae.

References

Spiraxidae
Gastropods described in 1846